Doumen may refer to:

Doumen District, in Zhuhai, Guangdong, China
François Doumen (born 1940), French racehorse trainer
Gert Doumen (born 1971), Belgian football goalkeeper

See also
Domen (disambiguation)